Matteo Antonio Babini (19 February 1754 – 22 September 1816), also known by the family name of Babbini, was a leading Italian tenor of the late 18th-century, and a teacher of singing and stage art.

Life and career
Matteo Babini was born in Bologna on 19 February 1754.

After studying in his town with Arcangelo Cortoni, he made his début at Modena probably in 1770 or 1771, at the age of 16 or 17, as a second tenor. It is likely he sang in a revival of Paisiello's  Demetrio.

After performing in several Italian theatres, most notably in the Teatro San Benedetto in Venice, Babini was engaged, between 1777 and 1781, to appear at Berlin's Court and, later, to perform works by Paisiello in Saint Petersburg. While there, he was popular performing in Paisiello's operas, even some in the comic genre with which he was not associated while in Italy.

Babini went on to perform all around Europe, including Lisbon, Madrid, Vienna, and London. In 1786, in London, he took part in the premiere of Cherubini's Giulio Sabino.

His career in Italy continued successfully through the nineties, with highlights including his part in the premiere of Cimarosa's Gli Orazi e i Curiazi, where he played the part of the villainous hero Marcus Horatius.

Babini retired from the stage in 1803, though he was still in demand for premiere performances by such composers as Zingarelli and Bertoni.

Having settled again in his native town, after an Italian career based almost wholly around Venice, he then proceeded to teach. In addition to singing, he also taught the stage art by which he had so much distinguished himself. One of his pupils was a teenaged Gioachino Rossini, who would recount, to Ferdinand Hiller in his old age, the story of his juvenile fancies to become a singer and of his meeting the great tenor.

Babini died in Bologna on 22 September 1816.

Artistic contributions
Matteo Babini played a key part in the recovery, towards the end of the 18th century, of the expressive character of operatic singing which, had been losing favour to the vocal acrobatics of the castrati and the higher notes of the sopranos. Being a baritonal tenor with a very narrow range, and not being particularly versed in coloratura, Babini felt at ease in only one octave (although, eventually, Orazi's only virtuoso aria was assigned to him).

Babini's main contributions to the renaissance of operatic art were through his role of actor-singer, and he became known for the exuberant style of his recitals, the realism of his acting, and his imposing stage presence – he was said to be tall, blond, and slender, and with a very fine countenance.

According to Giovanni Morelli, Babini's repertoire developed following his stays in Paris during the crucial moments of the French Revolution, in the years 1787 to 1789, and in 1792, and shifted towards the new-fashioned historical drama and the Rousseau monodrama cantata, especially Pimmalione, which he performed around the major Italian theatres with a huge success.

In his interpretations, Babbini endeavoured to portray "peoples' customs and heroes' vicissitudes", and in the Venetian premiere of Cimarosa's Oriazi he went on the stage wearing historical costume, "which the audience remained so much satisfied with, that thenceforth theatres turned it into an invariable standard".

Babini partnered, amongst others, Crescentini, Grassini, Banti, Pacchiarotti, and also the tenor Giacomo David, with whom he often alternated the same parts.

Roles 
The following list is not complete:

Notes

Further reading 

 Rodolfo Celletti, Storia del belcanto, Discanto Edizioni, Fiesole, 1983 

1754 births
1816 deaths
Italian operatic tenors
Musicians from Bologna